Martin Oliver is a British author of children's books. He recently gained notoriety online via the Huffington Post, after an 8-year-old girl had his books "Girls Only: How to Survive Anything" and "Boys Only: How to Survive Anything" pulled from bookstore shelves for claims of sexism.

Bibliography

Usborne Puzzle Adventure series
 The Intergalactic Bus Trip (1987)
 Agent Arthur's Jungle Journey (1988)
 Search for the Sunken City (1989)
 Agent Arthur's Arctic Adventure (1990)
 Agent Arthur on the Stormy Seas (1991)
 Agent Arthur's Desert Challenge (1994)
 Agent Arthur's Mountain Mission (1996)

The Young Indiana Jones Chronicles series
 Indiana Jones Puzzle Adventure Storybooks: II (The Young Indiana Jones Chronicles)  (1994)

Usborne Whodunnit series
 The Deckchair Detectives (1995)

Young Hippo Adventure series
 Attack of the Vampirates (1995)
 Revenge of the Vampirates (1995)

Hippo Ghost series
 The House at the End of Ferry Road (1995)

You Should See My... series
 You Should See My Dog (1995)
 You Should See My Cat (1996)
 You Should See My Mum (1998)

What's Wrong Mum? series
 Seaside (1997)
 Garden (1998)
 Shopping (1998)
 The Fletcher Family's Picnic Puzzle (1997)

Sparks series
 The Winner's Wreath: Ancient Greek Olympics (1999)

The Knowledge series
 Dead Dinosaurs (2000)
 Groovy Movies (2004)

Spilling the Beans on series
 Spilling the Beans on Making It in the Movies (2001)
 Spilling the Beans on Blackbeard (2000)

Other books
 McKricken's Christmas  (1991)
 Giggle Mirths of Waggle-down Derry (1991)
 "Flintstone's" Mystery Puzzle Book (1994)
 Goldilocks and the Three Bears (1999)

References

Living people
Year of birth missing (living people)
British writers
Usborne Puzzle Adventures